Karen Doljak (born 27 July 1978) is a Paraguayan racing cyclist. She competed in the 2013 UCI women's road race in Florence.

References

External links

1978 births
Living people
Paraguayan female cyclists
Sportspeople from Asunción